Trees For Tomorrow (also known as Region Nine Training School) is a specialty school focused on natural resources in Eagle River, Wisconsin. It was added to the National Register of Historic Places in 1996 for its significance in the conservation movement.

Course
Course and programs at Trees For Tomorrow take place from September through May. Groups range from 30 to 90 students, elementary school through high school age, and their teachers. The groups come from schools in the states of Wisconsin, Michigan and Illinois and generally stay at the campus for 4 to 6 days. Trees for Tomorrow is accredited by the North Central Association Commission on Accreditation and School Improvement (NCA CASI), an accreditation division of AdvancED. Melissa Hartley, a 2015 graduate of the University at Buffalo, interned for Trees for Tomorrow. She was a seasonal naturalist for one year from August 2012 to July 2013. She explained Trees for Tomorrow as a nature center and an education getaway. "That was an awesome experience," Hartley said. While obtaining her science education degree at the University at Buffalo between 2013 and 2015, Hartley returned to Trees for Tomorrow during the summer months as an intern.

References

School buildings on the National Register of Historic Places in Wisconsin
Schools in Wisconsin
Rustic architecture in Wisconsin
National Register of Historic Places in Vilas County, Wisconsin